Aurora First United Methodist Church, also known as the First United Methodist Church of Aurora and Aurora Methodist Episcopal Church, is a historic Methodist church located at 304 Third Street in Aurora, Dearborn County, Indiana. It was built between about 1855 and 1862, and is a two-story, gable front, Greek Revival style brick building.  It measures 45 feet, 6 inches, wide and 95 feet deep.  A limestone front was added to the original building in 1903 and one-story rear addition built between 1885 and 1888. The church was remodeled in 1954.

It was added to the National Register of Historic Places in 1994. It is located in the Downtown Aurora Historic District.

References

External links

church website

Methodist churches in Indiana
Churches on the National Register of Historic Places in Indiana
Churches completed in 1862
Greek Revival church buildings in Indiana
Churches in Dearborn County, Indiana
National Register of Historic Places in Dearborn County, Indiana
1862 establishments in Indiana
Historic district contributing properties in Indiana